The Strange Love of Martha Ivers is a 1946 American film noir drama directed by Lewis Milestone from a screenplay written by Robert Rossen (and an uncredited Robert Riskin), based on the short story "Love Lies Bleeding" by playwright John Patrick. Produced by Hal B. Wallis, the film stars Barbara Stanwyck, Van Heflin, Lizabeth Scott and features Kirk Douglas in his film debut.

The film was entered into the 1947 Cannes Film Festival. In 1974, the film entered the public domain in the United States because the claimants did not renew its copyright registration in the 28th year after publication.

Plot
On a rainy night in 1928 in a Pennsylvania factory town called Iverstown, thirteen-year-old Martha Ivers tries to run away from the guardianship of her wealthy, despicable aunt, Mrs. Ivers, with her friend, the street-smart, poor Sam Masterson. She is caught and brought home, where Martha's tutor, Walter O'Neil Sr., presents his timid son, Walter Jr., as the one responsible for Martha's recovery. Scolded by her aunt, Martha defiantly states her name is not Ivers, but Smith, her father's name.

During a power failure, Sam comes for her, but Martha's aunt hears her calling to him from downstairs. While Sam slips out unnoticed, Mrs. Ivers starts beating Martha's kitten with her cane. Martha wrestles the cane away from her aunt and strikes her across the head, causing her to fall down the stairs, accidentally killing her. When the power comes back on, Martha lies about the incident to Walter Sr. Even though Walter Jr. saw everything, he backs her up. The greedy Walter Sr. makes it clear to both Walter Jr. and Martha that he knows what happened but that as long as he and his son stand to benefit, he will play along. Sam leaves town.

Seventeen years later, in 1946, Walter Sr. is now dead, and Walter Jr. is now Iverstown's district attorney and is married to Martha, who has used her inheritance to expand the Ivers milling empire. Their marriage is one-sided; he loves her, but Walter knows she does not love him.

Sam, a former soldier and itinerant gambler, drives into the small town by chance and, after an accident, leaves his car to be repaired. While waiting, he goes to his old home, now a boarding house. He meets Antonia "Toni" Marachek, who has just been released from jail. She misses her bus, and they spend the night in adjoining rooms in a hotel. She is later picked up for violating her probation by not returning to her hometown. Sam asks Walter to use his influence to get Toni released.

Walter is convinced Sam has blackmail in mind. Sam then learns that Walter Sr. had presented Martha's version of the 1928 accidental murder to the police: that an intruder murdered Martha's aunt. With his leverage, Walter Sr. had made Martha marry his son. When the police identified a former employee of the aunt as the murderer, the two Walters and Martha helped convict him, and he was hanged.

When Martha reacts joyfully to seeing Sam, a jealous Walter forces Toni to set him up. Sam is beaten up and driven out of town, but he is too tough to be intimidated. When all else fails, Walter makes a halfhearted attempt to kill Sam himself but is easily disarmed. Walter inadvertently blurts out his fears of blackmail, only to learn that Sam had not witnessed the death. Martha breaks down and laments that he left without her all those years ago, taking her only chance for love and freedom with him.

Sam is torn between his old love and his new one with Toni. Although he eventually forgives Toni for betraying him, he and Martha spend an idyllic day together, rekindling his feelings for her.

Walter arranges to meet Sam to settle matters. Before Sam arrives, Walter gets drunk, and Martha finds out about the meeting. When Walter falls down the stairs, Martha urges Sam to kill her unconscious husband. Sam instead brings Walter around. Martha pulls out a gun and threatens to shoot Sam in "self-defense" as an intruder. Sam tells her it would work if she could get Walter to corroborate her story. Sam turns his back on her and leaves.
  		  	
Walter embraces and kisses Martha, then points the gun at her midriff. Oddly relieved, she puts her thumb over his finger on the trigger and presses. As she is dying, she defiantly states her name is not Martha Ivers, but Martha Smith. Outside, Sam hears the shot. He runs toward the mansion but sees Walter, holding Martha's body, shoot himself. Sam and Toni drive away together.

Cast
 Barbara Stanwyck as Martha Ivers
 Van Heflin as Sam Masterson
 Lizabeth Scott as Antonia "Toni" Marachek
 Kirk Douglas as Walter O'Neil
 Judith Anderson as Mrs. Ivers
 Roman Bohnen as Mr. O'Neil
 Darryl Hickman as Sam Masterson as a child
 Janis Wilson as Martha Ivers as a child
 Ann Doran as Bobbi St. John
 Frank Orth as Hotel clerk
 James Flavin as Detective #1
 Mickey Kuhn as Walter O'Neil as a child
 Charles D. Brown as McCarthy
 Blake Edwards as Sailor (uncredited)
 Robert Homans as Gallagher (uncredited) 
 Gladden James as John (uncredited)

Cast notes
 This film marked Kirk Douglas' screen debut. Producer Hal B. Wallis was on his way to New York to look for new talent when he ran into Humphrey Bogart and Lauren Bacall, who suggested that he go to a play which featured Bacall's old drama school classmate, Issur Demsky, who later took the name Kirk Douglas.  Douglas later wrote in his autobiography that Van Heflin was very helpful to him in his first time on a film set. In contrast to his later, tougher roles, Douglas plays an alcoholic weakling. According to Tony Thomas, "it assured Douglas his future in films".
 Future film director and producer Blake Edwards had an uncredited bit part as a sailor who hitches a ride with Sam.

Production
Director Lewis Milestone left the film for several days in sympathy with a set decorators' strike which was going on at the time.  In his absence, the film was directed by Byron Haskin, who did not receive screen credit. Stanwyck had considerable influence on how she was lit, and was not shy about putting her fellow actors on notice that she did not like to be upstaged.  When she saw the coin trick Heflin had learned—at Milestone's suggestion, to show that Heflin's character was a professional gambler—she informed him he should make sure he did not do it during any of her important lines, since she had a bit of business that would upstage him, if she had to.  With that she raised her skirt high and adjusted her garter.  Heflin is seen rolling a coin on his fingers several times in several scenes. Kirk Douglas later wrote that Stanwyck was indifferent to him at first, until at one point she focused on him and told him, "Hey, you're pretty good."  Douglas, smarting from having been ignored previously, replied, "Too late, Miss Stanwyck," but the two got on well after that.

Six months after the film's release, Milestone gave an interview in which he said he would never work for producer Hal B. Wallis again, because Wallis had wanted re-shoots in order to get more closeups of Lizabeth Scott.  Milestone refused, telling Wallis to shoot them himself, and, according to the director, Wallis did.

The film's ad campaign consisted only of teasers before its release: Newspapers ran ads reading, "Whisper her name!", while radio spots had a woman repeatedly whispering, "Martha Ivers".

Critical reception
The film has received acclaim from modern critics. It holds a 100% approval rating on Rotten Tomatoes, based on 10 reviews.

Dave Kehr from Chicago Reader wrote in a glowing review that the film "is pervaded by [Rossen’s] guilty-liberal fascination with power and money." And continued by saying "Director Lewis Milestone does little more than accent the hysteria of Rossen's script, though his portrait of the company town, bound in factory grime and feudal loyalty, is nicely done."

Awards and nominations

John Patrick received an Academy Award nomination for Best Writing, Original Motion Picture Story.

See also
 List of films in the public domain in the United States

References
Notes

External links

 
 
 
 
 
 

1946 films
1946 drama films
American drama films
American black-and-white films
1940s English-language films
Film noir
Films scored by Miklós Rózsa
Films based on short fiction
Films directed by Lewis Milestone
Films produced by Hal B. Wallis
Films set in 1928
Films set in 1946
Films set in Pennsylvania
Films with screenplays by Robert Rossen
Murder–suicide in films
Paramount Pictures films
1940s American films